Bystrzyca Valley Landscape Park (Park Krajobrazowy Dolina Bystrzycy) is a protected area (Landscape Park) in south-western Poland.

The Park lies within Lower Silesian Voivodeship.

Bystrzyca Valley
Parks in Lower Silesian Voivodeship
Wrocław County